Peak Sport Products Co., Limited is a Chinese manufacturing company of sportswear and footwear based in Quanzhou. Founded in 1989 as a shoe manufacturer, the company was listed on the Hong Kong Stock Exchange in 2009, however due to low performance on the stock exchange it has been acquired in August 2017.

Basketball has been Peak's strongest business since the beginning. Nowadays, the company covers a variety of sports such as association football, volleyball, running, tennis, and other sports. Peak is developing its business in America, Europe, Asia and Australia with more than 5000 exclusive stores. The company also owns many factories in Asia with 600 employees and more than 6,000 factory workers.

Business areas 

Peak Sport designs, develops, manufactures, distributes and markets its sportswear products under the Peak brand. Peak Sport sells all of its products in China on a wholesale basis to distributors who operate, either directly or through third-party retail outlet operators, authorized Peak retail outlets.

It also sells its products on a wholesale basis to overseas customers, as well as to overseas distributors who then sell the products to consumers, retailers or sports teams and clubs.

In mid-2009, Peak Sport Products Company had a distribution network of 5,667 authorized Peak retail outlets in China, which were operated either by the Peak Sport's distributors or by their third-party retail outlet operators.

Peak uses cotton from Xinjiang and has pushed back against reports of human rights abuses within the industry. Peak Chief Executive Ren Zhihua has touted Peak's ties with Xinjiang Litai Silk Road Investment, a company accused of using forced labor, in the face of criticism.

Sponsorships

Olympic Committees

  Algeria
  Brazil
  Cyprus
  Egypt
  Iceland
  Iraq
  Jordan
  Lebanon
  New Zealand
  Romania
  Saudi Arabia
  Slovenia
  Ukraine

Competitions 
 FIBA Stanković Continental Champions' Cup
 WTA in Asian Pacific Region
 WTA Pattaya Open

Associations 
Peak Sport supplies official for the following leagues and associations:
 FIBA Asia
  LNB
  PBA
  NBA

Basketball

National teams 

  Algeria
  Cameroon
  Central African Republic
  Germany
  Iran
  Israel
  Latvia
  Lebanon
  Mali  
  Montenegro       
  New Zealand
  Niger
  Nigeria Men
  Peru
  Qatar
  Romania
  Serbia
  Suriname
  Uzbekistan

Clubs 

  Atenas
  Gimnasia y Esgrima (CR)
  San Martín (C)
  Bendigo Spirit
  VOO Wolves Verviers-Pepinster
  Mississauga Power
  Colo-Colo
  Fos-sur-Mer
  Élan Béarnais Pau-Lacq-Orthez
  Fraport Skyliners
  TBB Trier
  PAOK
  Hapoel Jerusalem
  Hapoel Tel Aviv
  Maccabi Haifa
  Hekmeh
  Mouttahed
  Tadamon Zouk
  Monaco
  ZZ Leiden
  Meralco Bolts
  CS Universitatea Cluj-Napoca
  Nacional

Players 

 Răzvan Berbecaru
 Codrin Brendea 
 Terrence Romeo 
 Tony Parker (Retired)
 Miloš Teodosić (Virtus Bologna)
 Matthew Dellavedova (Cleveland Cavaliers)
 Beno Udrih (BC Žalgiris)
 Andrew Nicholson (Guangdong Southern Tigers)
 Lou Williams (Los Angeles Clippers)
 Carl Landry (Jilin Northeast Tigers)
 Anthony Morrow (Free Agent)
 Miles Plumlee (Free Agent)
 Kyle Singler (Free Agent)
 Andrew Wiggins (Golden State Warriors)

Boxing 
Peak (boxing vest and trunks) was officially worn by the National Brazilian Boxing team during the Saint Petersburg Governor Cup which was held from 7 to 11 May 2019, and the 2021 Olympic Games in Tokyo.

Field hockey

National teams 

  Ukraine

Football

Clubs teams 

  WA Tlemcen
  Sani Pro
  Pudong Zobon
  Shenyang Dongjin 
  Uniòn Estepona 
  Transvaal
  Hetten FC 
 Muscat Club 
  Triglav Kranj

Handball 
  Visoko

Swimming

National teams 
  Ukraine

Volleyball

National teams 
 Serbia 
 Romania

Players 
 Rachel Anne Daquis (Cignal HD Spikers)
 Chase Budinger

Tennis 
 Olga Govortsova

References

External links
 

Sportswear brands
Sporting goods manufacturers of China
Companies based in Fujian
Companies listed on the Hong Kong Stock Exchange
Clothing companies of China
Companies established in 1989
Shoe companies of China
Chinese brands